Nicholas F. Ryder (born October 31, 1941) is a former American football fullback who played in the National Football League. He played college football at Miami.

Early life
Ryder was born in Nyack, New York and attended Harverstraw High School.

College career
Ryder played three seasons for the Miami Hurricanes as a running back and defensive back. As a senior, he led the team with 702 rushing yards and six rushing touchdowns and catching nine passes for 127 yards and one touchdown and tied for the team lead with three interceptions on defense. His 702 yards was the highest total by a Miami player during the 1960s and he left the school as the fifth leading rusher in school history with 1,320 rushing yards.

Professional career
Ryder was selected by the Detroit Lions in the 10th round of the 1963 NFL Draft and by the New York Jets in the 16th round of the 1963 AFL Draft. He signed with the Lions and played two seasons with the team, rushing for 34 yards and one touchdown on 21 carries and catching four passes for 30 yards and one touchdown.

Coaching career
After his football career ended, Ryder coached at North Rockland High School and Notre Dame High School in Utica, New York before joining the coaching staff at Cortland State. He became the head coach at Maine-Endwell High School before leaving to join Bill Campbell's staff at Columbia University as and offensive backfield coach.

References

1941 births
Living people
Miami Hurricanes football players
Detroit Lions players
American football fullbacks
Columbia Lions football coaches
Cortland Red Dragons football coaches
Players of American football from New York (state)